Perania is a genus of Asian araneomorph spiders in the family Pacullidae that was first described by Tamerlan Thorell in 1890. It is considered a senior synonym of Mirania.

Species
 it contains twenty species, found in Asia:
Perania annam Schwendinger & Košulič, 2015 – Vietnam
Perania armata (Thorell, 1890) – Indonesia (Sumatra)
Perania birmanica (Thorell, 1898) – Myanmar
Perania cerastes Schwendinger, 1994 – Malaysia
Perania coryne Schwendinger, 1994 – Malaysia
Perania deelemanae Schwendinger, 2013 – Indonesia (Sumatra)
Perania egregia Schwendinger, 2013 – Thailand
Perania ferox Schwendinger, 2013 – Thailand
Perania harau Schwendinger, 2013 – Indonesia (Sumatra)
Perania korinchica Hogg, 1919 – Indonesia (Sumatra)
Perania nasicornis Schwendinger, 1994 – Thailand
Perania nasuta Schwendinger, 1989 – Thailand
Perania nigra (Thorell, 1890) (type) – Indonesia (Sumatra)
Perania picea (Thorell, 1890) – Indonesia (Sumatra)
Perania quadrifurcata Schwendinger, 2013 – Thailand
Perania robusta Schwendinger, 1989 – China, Thailand
Perania selatan Schwendinger, 2013 – Indonesia (Sumatra)
Perania siamensis Schwendinger, 1994 – Thailand
Perania tumida Schwendinger, 2013 – Thailand
Perania utara Schwendinger, 2013 – Indonesia (Sumatra)

See also
 List of Pacullidae species

References

Araneomorphae genera
Pacullidae
Spiders of Asia
Taxa named by Tamerlan Thorell